T.T.Ma was a five-member South Korean girl group that debuted in 1999. The group, which was referred to as the female version of NRG, disbanded in 2002.

History
One of the group songs, "Loner" was featured in the South Korean dance simulation game Pump It Up.

After some speculation of a third album, the group was disbanded in 2002, with only Soy (the group leader) continuing in the entertainment industry as a VJ.  On May 15, 2007, Ujin released a solo single and the band reunited for a Christmas single that year.

Members
Soy (소이)
Queena (퀴나) 
Juhae (주혜)  
Semi (세미)  
Ujin (유진)

Later changes
At the time of the second album, Juhae and Queena left T.T.Ma., and Zin and Euni were the new members.
Zin (진경) (b. October 13, 1981)
Euni (은희) (b. February 12, 1981)

Discography

Studio albums

References

External links 
Live performance of "My Baby" by T.T.Ma

South Korean girl groups
South Korean dance music groups
Musical groups established in 1999
Musical groups disestablished in 2002
1999 establishments in South Korea
2002 disestablishments in South Korea